Clarence Everett is an American former Negro league shortstop who played in the 1920s.

Everett played for the Kansas City Monarchs and Detroit Stars in 1927. In his 35 recorded games, he posted 17 hits and five RBI in 124 plate appearances.

References

External links
 and Seamheads

Year of birth missing
Place of birth missing
Detroit Stars players
Kansas City Monarchs players
Baseball shortstops